Universidad Nueva Esparta is a private university in Caracas. It was founded in 1954 by Dr. Juan Bautista Marcano Marcano and Prof. Gladys J. Carmona de Marcano.

The University is located in Los Naranjos, Caracas, and operated as an Institute until it met requisites to become a full University.
Career options such as Computer Science, Civil Engineering, Graphic Design, and Electronic Engineering are offered on campus.

External links
Official site

References 

Universities and colleges in Caracas
Educational institutions established in 1954
1954 establishments in Venezuela